Luiz Araújo may refer to:

 Luiz Alberto de Araújo (born 1987), Brazilian decathlete
 Luiz Araújo (footballer) (born 1996), Brazilian footballer